The 1993 Seagram's VO Cup, was the first edition of the Players' Championship, the championship tournament for the inaugural season of the World Curling Tour. It was held February 17–21, 1993 at the Calgary Curling Club in Calgary, Alberta. The total purse for the event was $120,000, with the winning team receiving $40,000.  

The semifinals and finals were broadcast on TSN. 

The event featured the "free guard zone", wherein the first three rocks of an end couldn't be removed if they were in the guard zone. This rule would later be adopted into the official rules of curling.

In an all-Ontario final, Russ Howard of Penetanguishene won his first of two Players' Championships, defeating Paul Savage of Toronto, 8–2.

Qualification
The top 30 men's teams on the "V.O. Cup standings" as of December 31, 1992 qualified for the event based on results from Tour events that season, along with the winner of a qualifying event and a sponsor's exemption. Adrian Bakker of Calgary qualified through winning the preliminary event and Tormod Andreassen of Norway was the sponsor's exemption.

V.O. Cup standings
Top 30 teams on the V.O. Cup standings, as of January 6, 1993. Struck out teams declined their invitation or were not registered. Teams ranked "x" were substitutes. 
 

After further drop outs, Doran Johnson of Lethbridge, Alberta, Bill Adams of Thunder Bay and Ron Mills of Saskatoon were invited to play, replacing Folk, Armstrong and Vavrek.

Qualifying event
One team qualified by winning the Acadia Recreational Complex cash bonspiel. The event was held at the Acadia Recreational Complex from January 29-31, in Calgary, and came with a purse of $10,500, and a top prize of $3,000. The winning team of Adrian Bakker, Jim Lautner, Ron Riggall and Scott Rankin of Calgary won the event, defeating Ken McLean of Regina, Saskatchewan in the final.

Knockout rounds
The scores were as follows:

A event

B Event

C Event

Playoffs

Quarter-finals

Semifinals

Final

References

Players' Championship
1993 in Canadian curling
1993 in Alberta
Curling competitions in Calgary
February 1993 sports events in Canada